Garbett's Wood is a woodland in West Sussex, England, in Rogate. It is owned and managed by the Woodland Trust.

References

Forests and woodlands of West Sussex